Hanazakarino Kimitachihe Original Soundtrack is the soundtrack album for the 2006 Taiwanese drama, Hanazakarino Kimitachihe, based on the Japanese manga, Hana-Kimi, starring Wu Chun and Jiro Wang of Fahrenheit; and Ella of S.H.E. It was released by HIM International Music on 1 December 2006.

Reception
Although the soundtrack did not chart until four weeks after its release, it debuted at #3 on the G-Music Charts, charted for over 10 weeks,

The album won Best Original Soundtrack at the 2007 KKBOX Music Awards and at the 2008 HITO Radio Music Awards presented by Taiwanese radio station Hit FM.

The tracks "超喜歡你" (I Really, Really Like You) and "怎麽辦" (What Should I Do?) were nominated for Top 10 Gold Songs at the Hong Kong TVB8 Awards, presented by television station TVB8, in 2007. Another track "專屬天使" (Special Angel) won one of the Top 10 Songs of the Year, also at the 2008 HITO Radio Music Awards.

Track listing 
 CD
 "怎麽辦" (What Should I Do?) - S.H.E (opening theme)
 "專屬天使" (Special Angel) - Tank (ending theme)
 "超喜歡你" (I Really, Really Like You) - Fahrenheit
 "懂了" (Understood) - Tank
 "我一直都在" (I'm Always There) - Lin Ji'an, Cheng Yulun
 "傻傻的勇氣" (Foolish Courage) - Venk
 "謝謝愛" (Thank You, Love) - Sister Garden
 "天使的擁抱 演奏曲" (Angel's Embrace - Instrumental)
 "偷偷愛 演奏曲" (Forbidden Love - Instrumental)
 "天使之泉 演奏曲" (Angelic Fountain - Instrumental)
 "完蛋了 演奏曲" (Done For - Instrumental)
 "幻想 演奏曲" (Fantasy - Instrumental)
 "Thanks to Love 演奏曲" (Thanks to Love - Instrumental)
 "愛到瘋狂 演奏曲" (Mad Love - Instrumental)
 "期待 演奏曲" (Expectation - Instrumental)
 "比超人還超喜歡你 演奏曲" (Compared to Superman, I Still Love You - Instrumental)

 DVD
 "怎麽辦" (What Should I Do?) - S.H.E MV
 "超喜歡你" (I Really, Really Like You) - Fahrenheit MV
 The making of Hanazakarino Kimitachihe and "怎麽辦" (What Should I Do?) MV Behind the Scenes

Charts

References

Television soundtracks
2006 soundtrack albums
Mandopop soundtracks
HIM International Music albums